Don't Go Looking Back is the debut album by Australian rock band Innocent Bystanders, originally released in 1986.  The album reached #59 on the Australian album charts in September 1986.

Track listing
All songs written by Brett Keyser.

 "Just My Mothers Son"
 "Lookin' Down At You"
 "Let Me In"
 "I Don't Care"
 "Dangerous"
 "Hard To Know"
 "Those Days"
 "Late Night Criers"
 "Don't Go Lookin' Back"

Charts

Personnel

Innocent Bystanders
Brett Keyser – vocals
John Dalzel – bass
Al Kash – drums
John Heussenstamm – guitar
Don Walker – Piano, C-3, DX-7

Additional musicians
Paul Ewing – Hammond, on "Just My Mother's Son", Piano, C-3 on "Those Days"
Peter Walker – Acoustic & electric guitar

Credits
Produced by Peter Walker
Recorded by Graham Owens & Peter Walker
Mixed by Steve Bywaters & Peter Walker
Executive Producers John Hopkins & Brett Townsend
Directed by Brett Townsend
Second Engineer Mark Whitehouse

References

1986 debut albums
Innocent Bystanders albums